Navidad sin fin is a Mexican telenovela produced by Eugenio Cobo for Televisa in 2001. This was the last Christmas telenovela that Televisa produced.

Plot
Has 3 different stories intertwined by the 3 important events at Christmas: Christmas Eve, new year and the arrival of the Kings Magi; they are lives that coincide and must unite to rescue family Christmas values.

Cast
Delia Beatriz De la Cruz Delgado as Angelita
Gustavo Cárdenas Ávila as Rodito
Alejandra Barros as Angelita
Ignacio Lopez Tarso as Rodito
Nancy Patiño as Angelita
Andrés Garza as Rodito
Sara Cobo as Marisela
Fernando Colunga as Pedro Montes
Ana Martín as Teófila
Alejandra Procuna as Julieta Moreno
Silvia Mariscal as Doña Isabel
Raúl Magaña as Mauricio
Blanca Sánchez as Matilde de Solares
Nora Salinas as Alejandra
Elizabeth Álvarez as Yolanda
Rosa María Bianchi as Josefina
Yadhira Carrillo as Toñita
Marlene Favela as Cuquis Ibarra

See also
 List of Christmas films

References

External links
 

2001 telenovelas
Mexican telenovelas
2001 Mexican television series debuts
2002 Mexican television series endings
Televisa telenovelas
Spanish-language telenovelas
Christmas television series